The 2020–21 Essex Senior Football League season was the 50th in the history of the Essex Senior Football League, a football competition in England.

The allocations for Steps 5 and 6 for season 2020–21 were announced by the FA on 21 July, and were subject to appeal. The league comprised 18 teams, a drop of one from the previous aborted season, with Tower Hamlets having been relocated to the Southern Counties East League.

The 2020–21 season started in September and was suspended in December a result of the COVID-19 pandemic. The league season was subsequently abandoned.

Promotions, relegation and restructure
The scheduled restructure of non-League took place at the end of the season, with new divisions added to the Combined Counties and the United Counties leagues at step 5 for 2021-22, along with a new division in the Northern Premier League at step 4. Promotions from step 5 to 4 were based on points per game across all matches over the two cancelled seasons (2019-20 and 2020-21), while teams were promoted into step 6 on the basis of a subjective application process.

League table
<onlyinclude>

Results Table

Stadia and locations

References

2020-21
2020–21 in English football leagues
Essex Senior Football League, 2020-21